Tomáš Cibulec (born 15 January 1978) is a retired Czech tennis player who turned professional in 1996. Cibulec reached his highest singles ranking on 3 August 1998, becoming world number 646. His career-high ranking of world number 21, he reached on 17 March 2003. A winner of three ATP doubles titles, Cibulec resides in Havířov, the city of his birth. Jindrich and Anna Cibulec are his parents. Before Cibulec became a professional, he became a tennis player at when he was seven.

Tennis career
Cibulec has successfully partnered with compatriots Ota Fukárek, Leoš Friedl, Petr Pála, Pavel Vízner and Croatian Lovro Zovko. He also reached the 2002 French Open doubles semifinals with Leander Paes. However, Cibulec has only won ATP doubles tournaments with Vízner and Friedl. He has reached one final with Futarek, won one out of three finals with Friedl, lost in one final with both Pála, has won two out of five doubles finals with Vízner, and lost in one final with Zovko.

In 2007, Cibulec and Zovko made the final of the Kremlin Cup in Moscow, but the pairing lost to at-home Russians Dmitry Tursunov and former singles number one, Marat Safin, 6–2, 6–4 in the final. En route, however, Cibulec and Zovko defeated 2007 French Open and 2007 US Open finalists Lukáš Dlouhý and Cibulec's former partner Pavel Vízner 6–2, 6–2. At moscow, Dlouhý and Vízner were the second-seeded doubles entrants.

ATP career finals

Doubles: 11 (3 titles, 8 runner-ups)

References

External links
 
 

1978 births
Czech male tennis players
Living people
People from Havířov
Sportspeople from the Moravian-Silesian Region